Monachaster sanderi is a species of sea stars in the family Oreasteridae. It is the sole species in the genus Monachaster.

References

Oreasteridae
Asteroidea genera
Monotypic echinoderm genera
Taxa named by Ludwig Heinrich Philipp Döderlein